Togolese cuisine is the cuisine of the Togolese Republic, a country in Western Africa. Staple foods in Togolese cuisine include maize, rice, millet, cassava, yam, plantain and beans. Maize is the most commonly consumed food in the Togolese Republic. Fish is a significant source of protein. People in Togo tend to eat at home, but there are also restaurants and food stalls.

Foods and dishes

Togolese style is often a combination of African, French, and German influences. The cuisine has many sauces and different types of pâté, many of which are made from eggplant, tomato, spinach, and fish. The cuisine combines these foods with various types of meat and vegetables to create flavorful dishes. Roadside food stands sell foods such as groundnuts, omelettes, brochettes, corn-on-the-cob, and cooked prawns.

Additional foods and dishes include:
 Agouti, known as "grasscutters".
Akpan, fermented maize dessert.
 Baguette bread
 Chili peppers are often used as a spice
 Fufu is very common, made from peeled and boiled yams which are then pounded with a pestle until reaching a dough consistency. Fufu is typically accompanied with sauces.
 Goat meat.
 Koklo meme, grilled chicken with a chili sauce.
 Kokonte, a pâté made from cassava
 Pâté, a commonly consumed cornmeal cake.
 Peanuts
 Riz sauce d’arachide, a rice dish made with groundnut sauce.
 Akume, prepared from ground maize served with a side, usually okra soup.

Beverages
 Red wine
 American-style beer
 White wine

See also
 Benin cuisine
 Burkinabé cuisine
 Ghanaian cuisine
 List of African cuisines

References

External links

 Togo Food from Culinary Encyclopedia by ifood.tv

 
West African cuisine
Cuisine